is a passenger railway station in the city of Kashiwa, Chiba, Japan, operated by the private railway operator Tōbu Railway. The station is numbered "TD-23".

Lines
Toyoshiki Station is served by Tobu Urban Park Line (also known as the Tōbu Noda Line), and lies 33.2 kilometers from the western terminus of the line at Ōmiya Station.

Station layout
The station consists of two opposed side platforms serving two tracks, connected by a footbridge.

Platforms

Adjacent stations

History
Toyoshiki Station was opened on 9 May 1911. From 17 March 2012, station numbering was introduced on all Tōbu lines, with Toyoshiki Station becoming "TD-23".

Passenger statistics
In fiscal 2019, the station was used by an average of 15,656 passengers daily.

Surrounding area
Edogawa University
Suwa Jinja
Toyoshiki Eki-mae Post Office

References

External links

Tōbu Railway Station information  

Railway stations in Japan opened in 1911
Railway stations in Chiba Prefecture
Tobu Noda Line
Stations of Tobu Railway
Kashiwa